Gupton is an unincorporated community in Franklin County, North Carolina, United States.

Gupton is located approximately eight miles east-northeast of Ingleside, off North Carolina Highway 561.

Laurel Mill and Col. Jordan Jones House, Dr. Samuel Perry House, and Speed Farm are listed on the National Register of Historic Places.

References

Unincorporated communities in North Carolina
Unincorporated communities in Franklin County, North Carolina